Otto Vasilievich Bremer (died 11 November 1873) was a Russian naturalist and entomologist.

He wrote:
Beiträge zur Schmetterlings-fauna des Nödrlichen China's (1853) with Vasilii Fomich Grey (William Grey).
"Neue Lepidopteren aus Ost-Sibirien und dem Amur Lande, gesammelt von Radde und Maack, beschrieben von Otto Bremer" (1861) , 3(7): 461-496
"Lepidopteren Ost-Sibiriens, insbesondere der Amur-Landes, gesammelt von den Herren G.Radde, R.Maack und P.Wulfius" (1864) Mémoires de l'Académie impériale des sciences de St.-Pétersbourg, 7 ser., 8(1): 103 pages

He described many insects, including the large skipper butterfly. Bremer's collection is in the Zoological Museum of the Russian Academy of Science in Saint Petersburg where he lived.

References
Anonym 1874: [Bremer, O.] Horae Societatis Entomologicae Rossicae 10(1873).

External links
Beiträge zur Schmetterlings-fauna des Nödrlichen China's 

Year of birth missing
1873 deaths
Russian naturalists
Russian lepidopterists
Biologists from the Russian Empire
Date of birth missing